The Chicago Fire Department is the second largest municipal fire department in the United States and one of the largest in North America. The Chicago Fire Department is organized in a paramilitary fashion, similar to that of most large municipal fire departments.

Personnel Profile and Rank Structure 
These are executive and emergency response members of the department, including administrative positions. Some of these members are included in emergency response.
The Fire Commissioner (known as Chief of the Department in other cities) is appointed by the Mayor of the city of Chicago and is Confirmed by the City Council.  1st Deputy Fire Commissioner, Deputy Fire Commissioner, Assistant Deputy Fire Commissioner, District Chiefs, Deputy District Chiefs, and Assistant Deputy Chief Paramedics are appointed by the Fire Commissioner. Battalion Chiefs, Captains, Lieutenants, Engineers, Paramedic Field Chiefs, and Ambulance Commanders are by examination.

Apparatus Profile 

Below is a complete listing of all fire companies and units operated by the Chicago Fire Department.

Frontline Fire Companies  
96 Engine Companies
50 Truck Companies
10 Tower Ladder Companies
1 Aerial Tower Company
4 Squad Companies
1 Fireboat Company
1 Reserve Fireboat Company

Command Units and Chiefs 
25 Battalion Chief Units (Battalions 1-24/5-1-5)
9 Paramedic Field Chief Units (4-5-1 Through 4-5-9)
14 Deputy District Chiefs (2-2-1 to 2-2-9)(4-1-5/4-1-6/4-1-8/4-1-9)(2-7-11)(5-1-0)(6-4-0)
12 District Chiefs (2-1-20 through 2-1-32)
2 Assistant Deputy Chief Paramedics (4-4-11/4-4-12)
4 Assistant Deputy Fire Commissioners (2-1-9 through 2-1-12)
4 Deputy Fire Commissioners (2-1-5 through 2-1-8)
1 1st Deputy Fire Commissioner (2-1-4)
1 Fire Commissioner (2-1-3)

Special and Support Units 
5 Command Vans (2-7-1/2-7-2/2-7-3/2-7-4/2-7-5)
1 Major Incident Command Van (2-7-9)
2 Hazardous Materials (Haz-Mat.) Incident Team (H.I.T.) Units (5-1-1/5-1-2)
1 Hazardous Materials (Haz-Mat.) Incident Team (H.I.T.) Support Unit (5-1-1a)
1 Hazardous Materials (Haz-Mat.) Decontamination (Decon.) Unit (5-3-0)
1 Hazardous Materials (Haz-Mat.) Mass Decontamination (Decon.) Unit (5-3-1)
1 Hazardous Materials (Haz-Mat.) Mobile Lab (5-1-11)
1 Collapse Rescue Unit (5-2-1)
1 Collapse Rescue Shoring Unit (5-2-2)
1 Technical Rescue Team (T.R.T.) Unit (5-2-5)
1 Tunnel Rescue Unit (5-2-6)
1 Vacuum Truck Unit (5-2-4)
1 Air Compressor Unit (5-2-3)
3 Jump Bag/Trash Pump Units (5-6-1/5-6-3/5-6-5)
1 Utility Unit (5-6-4)
1 Support Unit (6-4-8)
2 Box Trucks (6-4-14/6-4-15)
1 POD Truck (5-6-7) 
4 PODs (POD 1-4)
3 Fireground Rehabilitation (Rehab.) Units (5-7-1/5-7-2/5-7-3)
2 Hose Wagons (6-1-1/6-1-2)
2 Dry Chemical (Chem.) Units (6-2-4/6-2-5)
1 High-Expansion (Hi-Ex) Foam Unit (6-3-1)
1 Bulk Foam Carrier Unit (6-3-2)
1 Mobile Battery Vehicle (6-3-4)
3 Breathing Apparatus Service Bottle Trucks (6-4-4/6-4-5/6-4-6)
1 High-Rise Response Unit (6-4-16)
2 Airport Stairway Units (6-3-4/6-3-5)
10 Airport ARFF Crash Rescue Trucks (6-5-1 Through 6-5-10)
2 Airport Mini-Pumper Unit (6-3-7/6-3-8) 
2 Deluge Units (6-7-3/6-7-6)
2 Helicopters (6-8-1/6-8-2)
1 SCUBA Dive Team Unit (6-8-7)
2 Fast Rescue Boat (6-8-8/6-8-9)
4 Rescue Boats 
2 Jet Skis (JS 1/JS 2)
6 Mass Casualty Units (8-8-12 Through 8-8-16)
2 Light Wagons (9-1-3/9-1-5)
2 Smoke Ejector Units (9-2-1/9-2-2)
2 Mobile Ventilation Units (9-2-3/9-2-4)
4 Support Service Canteen Units (5-11 Club) (4-0-1 through 4-0-4)
3 Salvation Army Canteen Units (4-0-5/4-0-6/4-0-7)
1 Special Operations Specialty Extrication Equipment Unit (6-2-7)

EMS Units 
 80 Advanced Life Support (ALS) Ambulances 
 6 EMS Mass Casualty Triage Unit
 1 EMS Mass Casualty Command Support Unit
 1 EMS Oxygen Transport Bus 
 1 EMS Transport Bus
 3 EMS Logistics Supply Trucks

Fire Station Locations and Apparatus 
The Chicago Fire Department is organized into 5 Districts, which command a total of 24 Battalions and a Special Operations Battalion.

(*) All firehouses are identified by the Engine Company housed there, example " Engine 82s House or Engine 1s qtrs"

(*) Denotes a Paramedic (Advanced Life Support-staffed) company. All CFD Engine companies and Truck companies are Basic Life Support ( Emergency Medical Technician staffed) units at a minimum. There are some engines and trucks that are either Advanced Life Support or Basic Life Support staffed units.

1st Fire District 
The 1st Fire District is commanded by a District Chief (2-1-21). The 1st Fire District has a Deputy District Chief (2-2-1), who reports to the District Chief of the District.

2nd Fire District 
The 2nd Fire District is commanded by a District Chief (2-1-22). The 2nd Fire District has a Deputy District Chief (2-2-2), who reports to the District Chief of the District.

3rd Fire District / Airport Operations Division 
The 3rd Fire District is commanded by an Assistant Deputy Fire Commissioner (2-1-12) and is in charge of the Airport Operations Division. An Assistant Deputy Chief Paramedic (4-4-11/Engine 44's Firehouse)is in Charge of EMS Operations at O'Hare and 4-4-12 (Engine 84's Firehouse) is in charge of EMS Operations at Midway Airport. Currently (10/22), there is no Deputy District Chief or District Chief assigned to Airport Operations. O'Hare Rescues 1,2,3,4 and Midway Rescue (Airport Side of Firehouse) are located in the 3rd Fire District/Airport Operations Division.

District 3 has a pool of Spare Apparatus that are kept at the respective AMC's (Airport Maintenance Complex) which are located at each airport. This is the repair shops for all vehicles. The following apparatus are at the ORD facility: Engine 9-S/Engine 10-S/6-5-11/6-5-13/6-5-15/AVF-006 [Spare Battalion]/AVF-106 & AVF-107 [Spare Ambulances]/Spare Squad [used by Squad-7 & 5-1-2 if needed].

MDW facility: 6-5-1 R/ 6-5-2 R.

4th Fire District 
The 4th Fire District is commanded by a District Chief (2-1-24). The 4th Fire District has a Deputy District Chief (2-2-4), who reports to the District Chief of the District. 

Engine 127/Ambulance 54/Battalion 16 are considered "city companies" and all repairs and changing of apparatus are performed at city repair/radio shops.

5th Fire District 
The 5th Fire District is commanded by a District Chief (2-1-25). The 5th Fire District has a Deputy District Chief (2-2-5), who reports to the District Chief of the District.

Other Facilities 
The headquarters of the Chicago Fire Department is located at 3510 S. Michigan Ave.

The CFD's Special Operations Division is located at 3918 S. Honore St.

The CFD's Dispatch Center, the locales of the Main Fire Alarm Office (Main F.A.O.) and the Englewood Fire Alarm Office (Englewood F.A.O.) is located at 1411 W. Madison St.

The CFD's Air Sea Rescue Heliport is located at 3954 E. Foreman Dr.

The Quinn Fire Academy of the Chicago Fire Department is located at 558 W. De Koven St.

The CFD's City Warehouse is located at 1869 W Pershing Rd

The CFD's Support & Logistics Division is located at 31st St. & Sacramento Ave.

The CFD's EMS Support & Logistics Division is located at 31st & Sacramento Ave.

The CFD's Breathing Apparatus and Air Mask Service Station is located at 1044 N Orleans St.

Disbanded Fire Companies 

 Engine 3
 Engine 6
 Engine 12
 Engine 17
 Engine 20 - 1992
 Engine 21
 Engine 24
 Engine 25 - 543 West Taylor St. 1978
 Engine 27 - 1244 N. Wells 1978
 Engine 31
 Engine 33
 Engine 36
 Engine 37
 Engine 40
 Engine 41
 Engine 48
 Engine 51- NBC Chicago Fire 
 Engine 52
 Engine 53 - 
 Engine 61 - 2010
 Engine 66
 Engine 67
 Engine 77 - 2010 - Disbanded to form 2nd Haz-Mat Company
 Engine 85
 Engine 87
 Engine 90
 Engine 100 - 2010
 Engine 105
 Engine 111
 Engine 114
 Engine 118
 Engine 128
 Truck 43
 Truck 46

See also 
 Chicago Fire Department
 New York City Fire Department
 Organization of the New York City Fire Department
 Los Angeles Fire Department

References

External links 
 CFD Organizational Chart
 CFD Fire Company Locations Chart
 CFD Radio Signatures Chart
 CFD Locations and Maps
 Map of Chicago Fire Dept
 CFD Official Website

Chicago Fire Department